Schmetterer is a German surname. Notable people with the surname include:

Bob Schmetterer (born 1943), American business executive and author
Leopold Schmetterer (1919–2004), Austrian mathematician

German-language surnames